Mt. Juliet High School (MJHS) is a public high school located in Wilson County, Tennessee. It is not within Mt. Juliet city limits, but it serves parts of southern and eastern Mt. Juliet. The principal is Beverly Sharpe.

In 2008, MJHS moved from its previous building on Mt. Juliet Road to a new building located at 1800 Curd Road. The old building became Mt. Juliet Middle School. The address changed to 1875 Golden Bear Gateway in 2017.

The school's slogan is "Bear Pride Mt. Juliet High."

Athletics
Mt. Juliet competes in TSSAA Division 1, District 9-AAA in all sports except football. In football, Mt. Juliet participates in the TSSAA Division 1, 6A Region 4.

Football
Mt. Juliet fielded its first football team in 1923–24 and was coached by Jack Gifford. The high school has fielded a team every year since 1936. The team is coached by Trey Perry.

Mt. Juliet has appeared in the TSSAA playoffs 17 times and has appeared every year since 2006. In 2012 Mt. Juliet went to the 6A state semifinals, losing to eventual state champion Memphis Whitehaven 41–35.

Rivalries 
Wilson Central, MJHS's rival school, opened in 2001. When Wilson Central opened, the area was re-zoned, moving some Mt. Juliet students to Wilson Central.

Similarly, Green Hill High School (GHHS) was completed in 2020, rezoning hundreds of students from MJHS. On October 29, 2021, GHHS defeated MJHS in their first-ever football game at Elzie D. Patton stadium.

Baseball
2001–2018: Mark Purvis (516–194). Under Purvis, Mt. Juliet went to eight TSSAA sectional games and won the District 9-AAA championship nine times (2006, 2007, 2008, 2009, 2010, 2011, 2012, 2013, 2016 & 2018). Over 100 of Purvis' players played collegiately, including nine in the SEC—eight to Vanderbilt University and one to the University of Tennessee.

2019: Mark Decker (349–181) replaced Mark Purvis.

Girls Basketball
TSSAA Girls Basketball AAA State Champs 1977, 1983, and 2005.

Tornado recovery
As a result of the deadly March 2020 tornado, MJHS was temporarily converted to a grade 7-12 school to house displaced students from West Wilson Middle School (WWMS). WWMS students were relocated to the west wing of MJHS, while MJHS students were relocated to the east wing. All students shared the common areas.

Notable alumni
Levi Brown, quarterback for the Buffalo Bills
Amanda Butler, head women's basketball coach at Clemson University and former head coach at University of Florida
Alysha Clark, American-Israeli basketball player for the Seattle Storm of the Women's National Basketball Association
Caleb Cotham, baseball player
 Jared Followill, bassist from band Kings of Leon
 Matthew Followill, guitarist from band Kings of Leon
Ben Hayslip, 2011 and 2012 ASCAP Country Music Songwriter of the Year
Taylor Hill, professional baseball player 
Michael Jasper, head football coach at Bethel University, football player for the New York Giants.
Dale Wainwright, Texas Supreme Court Justice (2003–12)
Barry E. Wilmore, NASA astronaut

References

Public high schools in Tennessee
Schools in Wilson County, Tennessee